Essegney is a commune in the Vosges department in Grand Est in northeastern France. It is part of the arrondissement of Épinal.

Demographics 
The population development of the village.

See also
Communes of the Vosges department

References

Communes of Vosges (department)